The canton of Lambersart is an administrative division of the Nord department, northern France. It was created at the French canton reorganisation which came into effect in March 2015. Its seat is in Lambersart.

It consists of the following communes:

Bousbecque
Comines
Lambersart
Linselles
Lompret
Quesnoy-sur-Deûle
Verlinghem
Wervicq-Sud

References

Cantons of Nord (French department)